Ali Solih is a Maldivian politician from the Jumhooree Party currently serving as Minister of State for Environment, Climate Change and Technology in the Cabinet of the Maldives.

Personal life 
On 22 August 2022, he was stabbed in the street, sustaining injuries to his arm.

References 

Living people
Government ministers of the Maldives
21st-century Maldivian politicians
Jumhooree Party politicians
Year of birth missing (living people)